Deh Shib-e Mirza Hasani (also Romanized as Deh Shīb-e Mīrzā Ḩasanī; also known as Deh Shīb) is a village in Now Bandegan Rural District, Now Bandegan District, Fasa County, Fars Province, Iran. At the 2006 census, its population was 584, in 135 families.

References 

Populated places in Fasa County